Olympic Bridge or Grand Olympic Bridge is a bridge over the Han River in Seoul, South Korea. The bridge links the Gwangjin and Songpa districts.

Construction
Its construction started in 1985, but was not completed until 1990, after the Seoul Olympic Games of 1988, because the bridge under construction had collapsed.

2001 military helicopter crash
On May 29, 2001, a CH-47D helicopter from ROK Army, attempting to lower a sculpture onto the top of the bridge, crashed and fell into the Han River, killing all three on board.

References

Bridges in Seoul
Cable-stayed bridges in South Korea
Bridges completed in 1990
1990 establishments in South Korea
Buildings and structures in Songpa District
Buildings and structures in Gwangjin District
20th-century architecture in South Korea